National Lampoon Presents Endless Bummer aka Surf Party is an American 2009 comedy film directed by Sam Pillsbury, starring Jim Piddock and Khan Chittenden. The plot involves a group of teens and a veteran surfer, who take a road trip from Ventura, California to the San Fernando Valley, in order to track down a prized stolen surfboard.

Cast
 Jim Piddock as Mr. Newell
 Ray Santiago as Lardo
 Khan Chittenden as J.D.
 Vanessa Angel as Brenda
 Colton James as "Sparky"
 Allison Scagliotti as Iris
 Caitlin Wachs as Anne
 Jane Leeves as Liv
 Matthew Lillard as Mike Mooney
 Jules Bruff as Carol
 James J. Thomas as Richard
 Joan Jett as Del
 Richmond Arquette as Harry
 Kathleen Wilhoite as Peggy
 Kenny Laguna as Mr. Canadianedas
 Sara Downing as Ginger Mooney
 Andrew Caldwell as Kenny
 James Remar as Sam Kramer
 Lee Ving as Hot Rod Guy
 Debbie DeLisi as Hot Rod Girl
 Scott Caudill as Creepy Guy #1
 Jeff Staron as Creepy Guy #2
 Shayne Lamas as Volleyball Bikini Girl
 Gabriel Jarret as Gabe
 Affion Crockett as "Coco"

References

External links
Endless Bummer Official site

National Lampoon films
2009 comedy films
2009 films
Teensploitation
Films directed by Sam Pillsbury
2000s English-language films